Taking Stock is a 2015 popular, independent caper film written and directed by Maeve Murphy and starring Kelly Brook. It was shot on location in Kings Cross, London in homage to The Ladykillers. Some interior scenes were shot in Crystal Palace, London. The film tackles the issue of redundancy and unemployment in a lighthearted way as Kate fantasises about robbing the shop that has just made her redundant.

Taking Stock is based on Murphy's award-winning short film Sushi (Venice Film Festival 2011).

Taking Stock premièred 4 October 2015 at the Raindance Film Festival and Swipe Films Distribution released it theatrically across the UK in key cities on 5 February 2016.

Taking Stock was released online on 21 June 2016. Google Play made it "Staff Pick" Popular Independent new releases and the film was bought and released by Netflix and featured in the top 3 on the front page "Popular on Netflix" section.

Plot
Suddenly made redundant  and at rock bottom, Kate takes control by revealing her inner bad girl..

Kate (played by Kelly Brook) is an out of work actress who is working in a shop. Until she gets made redundant, that is. In a week from hell, Kate's boyfriend leaves her, the shop goes bust and much to her dismay, rent and gas bills have not been paid.  Inspired by Bonnie Parker, Kate gathers a rag tag gang from her young shop assistant friends and comes up with a plot to rob the shop. But where is her Clyde?

Cast
 Kelly Brook as Kate
 Georgia Groome as Kelly
 Jay Brown as Nick
 Femi Oyeniran as Sponge
 Scot Williams as Mat
 Lorna Brown as Christina
 Junichi Kajioka as Yoichi

Reception
The film received mostly warm reviews, notably from The Huffington Post, MCMbuzz  and Rich Cline Shadows on the Wall.                                                                                                                                Mark Kermode in The Observer marked out praise for Maeve Murphy as a writer-director. 
Taking Stock won 8 international Film Festival Awards. 
MTV championed the film at its premier at the Raindance Film Festival predicting that it could be a festival award winner and an indie success. 
Google Play made it their "staff pick" popular independent new releases.

Awards 
Monaco International Film Festival December 2015 
Taking Stock directed by Maeve Murphy Winner of the Independent Spirit Award
Taking Stock Winner of Best Cinematography Gerry Vasbenter
Taking Stock Winner of Best Supporting Actor Junichi Kajioka
Taking Stock Winner of Best Producer, Maeve Murphy, Frank Mannion, Richard Yetzes
Garden State Film Festival USA March 2016 
Taking Stock Winner of the Bud Abbott Award for Feature Length comedy recipient Director Maeve Murphy and Producer Geoff Austin
Wind International Film Festival USA July 2016 
Winner Best Female Film maker ( Director - Writer) in the comedy section, Maeve Murphy for Taking stock
Winner Best Supporting Actor in the comedy section, Junichi Kajioka as Yoichi in Taking Stock
Sochi International Film Festival and Film Awards Russia December 2016 
Winner of the President's Award, director Maeve Murphy for Taking Stock

References

External links

2015 films
British independent films
British comedy-drama films
2015 comedy films
2010s British films